Mosinee may refer to:
 Mosinee, Wisconsin
 Mosinee (town), Wisconsin